The 1991 New Territories West by-election was held on 8 December 1991 after the incumbent Legislative Councillor Tai Chin-wah of New Territories West resigned from the Legislative Council of Hong Kong (LegCo) on 8 October 1991 weeks after the 1991 general election as he was being discovered of his falsified legal qualifications.

The liberal Meeting Point (MP) Zachary Wong Wai-yin, who was fully supported by the United Democrats of Hong Kong (UDHK) triumphed over two conservative candidates with rural background, Tang Siu-tong and Kingsley Sit Ho-yin, and a liberal Association for Democracy and People's Livelihood (ADPL) candidate Yim Tin-sang, by receiving 21,559 votes with a 40 percent plurality.

The result raised the pro-democracy camp's total directly elected seats to 17, enlarging their strength in the legislature to 21, similar to that of the conservative Co-operative Resources Centre bloc.

Tai was later found guilty of forging credentials and was given a six-month jail sentence, suspended for one year.

Candidates
The pro-democratic Meeting Point (MP) nominated Zachary Wong Wai-yin, the candidate in the September general election in 1991 who lost to Tai Chin-wah. As the electoral ally in the general election, the United Democrats of Hong Kong (UDHK) endorsed Wong.

Another pro-democratic party, the Association for Democracy and People's Livelihood (ADPL) also field a candidate, Yim Tin-sang, a Tuen Mun District Board member. The two pro-democratic parties fielding candidates against each other also sparked some controversies within the camp.

Tang Siu-tong and Kingsley Sit Ho-yin, both came from rural background also ran in the election.

Result

See also
 1991 Hong Kong legislative election
 List of Hong Kong by-elections
 1992 New Territories West by-election

References

1991 in Hong Kong
1991 elections in Asia
1991